Enok Lopponen (January 1885 – 7 December 1963) was a Finnish wrestler. He competed in the freestyle middleweight event at the 1920 Summer Olympics representing Canada.

References

External links
 

1885 births
1963 deaths
People from Mikkeli
People from Mikkeli Province (Grand Duchy of Finland)
Canadian male sport wrestlers
Olympic wrestlers of Canada
Wrestlers at the 1920 Summer Olympics
Finnish male sport wrestlers
Finnish emigrants to Canada
Sportspeople from South Savo